"Sacred Trust / After You're Gone" is the debut double-A side single of British boy band One True Voice. It was released on 16 December 2002, the same day that female winners Girls Aloud released their single "Sound of the Underground". The two songs were competing for the coveted Christmas number one spot on the UK Singles Chart. "Sacred Trust / After You're Gone" reached number two on that chart, beaten to the top by "Sound of the Underground". The double A-side also reached number nine in Ireland.

"Sacred Trust" is a cover version of a song originally written and produced by the Bee Gees from the 2001 album This Is Where I Came In.

Release and reception
One True Voice were formed in November 2002 on the ITV1 programme Popstars: The Rivals. The concept of the programme was to produce a boyband and a girlband who would be 'rivals' and compete for the Christmas number one single in 2002. The five boys who made it into the group which was to be managed by Pete Waterman were Daniel Pearce, Matt Johnson, Keith Semple, Jamie Shaw, and Anton Gordon. The boy band were managed by Pete Waterman. The two groups competed for the number one position in the Christmas week issue of the UK Singles Chart, and Girls Aloud came out on top with their song "Sound of the Underground". Girls Aloud later released their own version of "Sacred Trust" on the rarities disc of their 2006 greatest hits album The Sound of Girls Aloud.

Chart performance
"Sacred Trust / After You're Gone" debuted at number two on the UK Singles Chart on 22 December 2002, the same day as their rivals Girls Aloud reached number one with "Sound of the Underground". The single sold 147,000 copies compared to first week sales of 213,000 for "Sound of the Underground". In Ireland it only managed to chart at number nine while Girls Aloud entered the chart at number two. It remained in both charts for six weeks.

Track listing

Charts

Weekly charts

Year-end charts

Certifications

References

2001 songs
2002 debut singles
Bee Gees songs
Jive Records singles
Songs written by Barry Gibb
Songs written by Maurice Gibb
Songs written by Robin Gibb
UK Independent Singles Chart number-one singles